NY most commonly refers to:

 New York (state), a state in the Northeastern United States
 New York City, the most populous city in the United States, located in the state of New York

NY, Ny or ny may also refer to:

Places
 North Yorkshire, an English county
 Ny, Belgium, a village
 Old number plate of German small town Niesky

People 
 Eric Ny (1909–1945), Swedish runner
 Marianne Ny, Swedish prosecutor

Letters 
 ny (digraph), an alphabetic letter 
 Nu (letter), the 13th letter of the Greek alphabet, transcribed as "Ny"
 ñ (énye), sometimes transcribed as "ny"

Other uses 
 New Year
 Air Iceland (IATA code: NY)
 Chewa language (ISO 639-1 code: ny)

See also
 New Year (disambiguation)
 New York (disambiguation)
 NYC (disambiguation)
 NYS (disambiguation)